The British Society of Oral Health and Disability is an association devoted to bringing together those interested in the oral care of people with disabilities.

Selected publications
     Undergraduate curriculum in Special Care Dentistry (2014)
     Multi-disciplinary Guidelines for the Oral Management of Patients following Oncology Treatment updated 2012
     Clinical Guidelines & Integrated Care Pathways for the Oral Health Care of People with Learning Disabilities updated 2012
     Guidelines for the Delivery of a Domiciliary Oral Healthcare Service, revised 2009
     The Provision of Oral Care under General Anaesthesia in Special Care Dentistry - A Professional Consensus Statement, 2009
     Commissioning Tool for Special Care Dentistry. A document produced by the British Society of Disability and Oral Health and funded by the Department of Health, 2006
     Developing an Undergraduate Curriculum in Special Care Dentistry Prepared by a Working Group of the Teachers Group of BSDH
     Principles on Intervention for People Unable to Comply with Routine Dental Care
     Guidelines for Oral Health Care for Long-stay Patients and Residents
     Guidelines for the Development of Local Standards of Oral Health Care for Dependent, Dysphagic, Critically and Terminally Ill Patients
     Oral Health Care for People with Mental Health Problems:
     Guidelines for Oral Health Care for People with a Physical Disability

References 

Dentistry in the United Kingdom
Disability rights